Louis Allis, Jr. (April 14, 1916 in Milwaukee, Wisconsin – March 26, 1994 in Scottsdale, Arizona) was an industrialist. Allis started working for the Louis Allis Company in the 1940s and served in the United States Army during World War II.

From December 16, 1954 until January 3, 1955, Louis Allis was Secretary of State of Wisconsin following the death of Fred R. Zimmerman who died in office.

References

External links

1916 births
1994 deaths
Politicians from Milwaukee
Military personnel from Wisconsin
Secretaries of State of Wisconsin
20th-century American politicians
United States Army personnel of World War II